Josep is a 2020 animated biographical film directed by Aurel (in his directorial debut) from a script by Jean-Louis Milesi, detailing the life of Catalonian cartoonist and revolutionary Josep Bartolí, following his experience during the Spanish Civil War, after the Second World War and his relationship with the Mexican painter Frida Kahlo. An international co-production between France, Belgium and Spain, the film was produced by Serge Lalou for Les Films d’Ici Méditerranée, in co-production with Les Films du Poisson Rouge, In Effecto, Tchack, Les Films d’Ici, Lunanime and Promenons-nous dans les bois.

Josep was set to premiere at the 2020 Cannes Film Festival in May 2020, however it was cancelled due to the COVID-19 pandemic. Subsequently, it premiered at the Annecy International Animation Film Festival in France on 22 June 2020, and was released theatrically in France on 30 September 2020. It received generally positive reviews from critics, and won several accolades, including the César Award for Best Animated Film and European Film Award for Best Animated Feature Film.

Plot 
In February 1939, artist Josep Bartolí had to flee his native Spain, which fell under Franco's dictatorship after the Spanish Civil War. Like thousands of other Spanish refugees, he went to France, but ended up in a concentration camp. The under-fed refugees are victims of ill-treatment. However, the artist befriends a gendarme (French military policeman) who secretly gives him a pencil and paper. Josep Bartolí eventually goes to New York and Mexico where he meets the painter Frida Kahlo, with whom he falls in love.

Cast 
Sergi López as Josep Bartolí
Bruno Solo as the military policeman (Serge)
Gérard Hernandez as old Serge (Valentin's grandfather)
David Marsais as Valentin
Sílvia Pérez Cruz as Bertillia / Frida Kahlo
Alain Cauchi as Leon
François Morel as Robert
Sophia Aram as the nurse
Xavi Serrano as Helios Gómez
Valérie Lemercier as Valentin's mother
Thomas VDB as Valentin's father

Release 
Josep was originally set to premiere at the 2020 Cannes Film Festival in May 2020, however it was cancelled due to the COVID-19 pandemic. Subsequently, it premiered at the Annecy Film Festival in France on 22 June 2020. It was theatrically released in France on 30 September 2020, and grossed $1,373,465.

Reception 
On review aggregator Rotten Tomatoes, the film holds an approval rating of  based on nine critical reviews.

References

External links 

2020 animated films
2020s French animated films
Belgian animated films
Spanish animated films
French biographical films
Belgian biographical films
Spanish biographical films
Spanish Civil War films
2020s war films
French war films
Belgian war films
Spanish war films
2020 films
2020s biographical films
2020s French-language films
Animated feature films
2020s French films